The Minister of Lands in New Zealand was a cabinet position appointed by the Prime Minister to be in charge of the Department of Lands and Survey.

List of ministers
The following ministers held the office of Minister of Lands.

Key

Table footnotes:
<noinclude>

Notes

References

Lands